Greenville Presbyterian Theological Seminary is a confessional Presbyterian seminary in Taylors, South Carolina, United States. Founded in 1986, Greenville Presbyterian Theological Seminary exists to equip preachers, pastors, and churchmen for Christ's Kingdom. The school is modeled on Old Princeton Theological Seminary of the late 19th and early 20th centuries. It teaches the accuracy and doctrinal integrity of the Westminster Confession of Faith, together with the Larger and Shorter Catechisms, as adopted by the Presbyterian Church in America. It is not affiliated with a specific denomination, but graduates of the Seminary minister in denominations such as the Presbyterian Church in America (PCA), Orthodox Presbyterian Church (OPC). Associate Reformed Presbyterian Church (ARP), United Reformed Churches in North America (URCNA), Reformed Church in the United States (RCUS), Reformed Presbyterian Church (Hanover Presbytery), Free Church of Scotland (Continuing Synod), Evangelical Presbyterian Church in England and Wales (EPCEW), Reformed Presbyterian Church of North America (RPCNA), Igreja Presbiteriana do Brasil (Presbyterian Church of Brazil), Association of Reformed Baptist Churches of America (ARBCA), Reformed Baptist Network (RBN), Communion of Reformed Evangelical Churches (CREC), Bible Presbyterian Church (BPC), Presbyterian Reformed Church (PRC), and in a number of Independent congregations. The current president of the seminary is Jonathan Master, formerly the Dean of the School of Divinity at Cairn University.

Degrees offered
 Divinity Program with a Bachelor and Master of Divinity
 Master of Ministry for elders
 Master of Arts (with specializations in the areas of Biblical Languages, and church history, systematic theology)
 Master of Theology
 Doctor of Theology (with specializations in the areas of biblical languages, and church history, systematic theology)

In addition to a low tuition rate, the seminary offers a waiver program that allows men from approved churches to pursue a Bachelor or Master of Divinity degree tuition for free.

The school is accredited by the Association of Reformed Theological Seminaries, of which it is a charter member.

Institutional history
Greenville Presbyterian Theological Seminary was founded in 1986 with a firm commitment to Strict Subscription to the Westminster Standards and for the purpose of training ministers of the gospel to perpetuate the tradition of Old School Presbyterianism. Although the desire to establish such an institution in South Carolina had been strong in Calvary Presbytery since the founding of the Presbyterian Church in America in 1973, attempts by that body in 1976 and again in 1981 failed to result in any progress toward the goal. It was not until some years later that interest was once again raised when an independent group took up the cause.

In January 1985 Inter-Term and the Fall academic semester 1985, then Presbyterian Church in America (PCA) General Assembly Stated Clerk, Dr. Morton H. Smith, taught courses on Old Testament Bible Survey and the Theology of the Westminster Standards at Covenant Theological Seminary in St. Louis, Missouri as an adjunct professor. In addition to inculcating in the students the importance of Strict Subscription to the Westminster Standards and the Old School Presbyterian interpretation of the same, preliminary discussions concerning the possible establishment of a new seminary in the Washington, D.C., area for this Old School position were referred to.  News of this prospect soon reached Ruling Elder J. Ligon Duncan, Jr. and Teaching Elder Paul G. Settle of Second Presbyterian Church in Greenville, South Carolina, since their church sponsored four candidates for the ministry at Covenant during this period. In response to the possibility of a new seminary beginning outside the Upstate of South Carolina, these officers of Second Church requested that two of their sponsored students prepare a comparison of "The Uniform Curriculum" adopted by the PCA and all the seminaries then serving that denomination. The fruit of this study was presented to these officers and Dr. Smith at the Duncan home on February 26, 1986. The need for an Old School seminary and the advantages that the Greenville area offered for such were discussed in detail by these ordained officers.

A steering committee was then formed consisting of Teaching Elders Paul G. Settle, John C. Neville, Jr., and Morton H. Smith and Ruling Elders J. Ligon Duncan, Jr. and C. Stuart Patterson. They first offered the new President of Covenant Theological Seminary the option of having the intended Old School seminary as a branch of Covenant Seminary, but he declined.  Undeterred, this group assumed the responsibility of seeing to the actual organization and establishment of such a school. In March 1986, Rev. Settle, acting on behalf of the Steering Committee, sent a letter to selected Ruling and Teaching Elders of the PCA announcing the establishment of the James Henley Thornwell Seminary.  During the first year of operation, Duncan Rankin was asked to return to South Carolina and complete his ministerial internship while serving as Administrative Assistant to the Board and reporting to Rev. Settle. On October 2, 1986, a Presentation Banquet, at which Dr. James I. Packer was the featured speaker, was held to celebrate the establishment of the Seminary. The Seminary was incorporated under the laws of the State of South Carolina under the name James Henley Thornwell Theological Seminary, but the use of this name was protested by officials of the PCUS's Thornwell Orphanage in nearby Clinton, SC and, as a result, the Steering Committee changed the name of the institution to Greenville Presbyterian Theological Seminary. Dr Smith was appointed Dean of the Faculty and Administrator, in which capacity he continued until January 1, 1998, when Dr. Joseph A. Pipa, Jr. was appointed as the institution's first President, in which office he served until 2020.

In spite of the gala send-off in late 1986, it appeared in early 1987 that the fledgling institution might never see its first class. At that point, the decision was made to offer some evening classes to the public under the auspices of an "Evening School of the Bible" in order to serve the Christian community and acquaint a wider audience with the new institution. These classes were taught over five nights in March and April 1987. Then during May 14–16, 1987 the Board of Directors sponsored a Spring Bible Conference on "Reformed Preaching," with Drs. Jay E. Adams, Sinclair B. Ferguson, and Douglas F. Kelly as the speakers. This venture was so well received that it proved to be just the impetus needed to encourage the committee to take the step of faith and launch the school's first year in the Fall of 1987. Thus the first Convocation was held on September 1, 1987, and classes began immediately thereafter. The first Commencement took place on September 7, 1991, with three men receiving degrees.

When classes began in 1987, the Directors of the institution reconstituted themselves as the board of trustees and elected Mr. William H. Huffman as chairman. He served in that position until succeeded, in 1997, by Mr. John H. Van Voorhis. Both of these men were ruling elders in the PCA.

In the early years, offices and classes were housed in the facilities of the Augusta Street Presbyterian Church in Greenville. As enrollment and faculty grew over the years and the ownership of the facility changed hands, the Board undertook a study of the needs of the institution and began a search of the area for a facility that would meet her needs for some years to come. After investigation of a number of alternatives, the decision was made in January 1998 to purchase the building that had housed Community Baptist Church in Taylors, S.C. (a nearby suburb of Greenville). Thus the institution began 1998 in new facilities and under the leadership of her new president.

Over the next five years the seminary experienced significant growth and it became quite clear that the facilities at 418 East Main St. in Taylors would soon be unable to house all of the new students and staff. In 2003, therefore, the seminary purchased the Old Taylors High School (less than a quarter of a mile away) and began to raise the funds necessary for its renovation. On a cold day in February 2007, the seminary officially broke ground. A building that was once at the heart of Old Taylors, but which had been severely neglected, now began to take on a new look, reminding many of the transformation that Christ brings to His people. In January 2008, the seminary moved into its new facilities; and the building was officially dedicated at the 2008 Spring Theology Conference in March.

Affiliations
1. The seminary is formally approved by the Presbyterian Church in America, Orthodox Presbyterian Church, and other denominations affiliated with the North American Presbyterian and Reformed Council (NAPARC). The Reformed Church in the United States has formally adopted the seminary and placed a member on the board of trustees. The seminary seeks ecclesiastical relationships with sessions (Sponsoring Sessions) and Presbyteries (Oversight Presbyteries). Currently a number of sessions have entered into the Sponsoring-Session relationship, and one Presbytery and one Denomination have adopted Oversight roles. The seminary sends special reports to these ecclesiastical bodies, seeks their advice, and invites them to participate in accreditation visits. Increasingly, members of the Board of Trustees are selected from Sponsoring and Oversight Courts.

2. A number of professors are members of the Evangelical Theological Society.

3. All Board Members are ordained elders (Teaching or Ruling) in theological conservative, Reformed, and confessional denominations.

Principal constituencies served
The seminary principally serves the Presbyterian Church in America (PCA), Orthodox Presbyterian Church (OPC), and Associate Reformed Presbyterian Church (ARP). Graduates also serve in the United Reformed Church of North America (URCNA), Reformed Church in the United States (RCUS), Reformed Presbyterian Church (Hanover Presbytery), Free Church of Scotland (Continuing Synod), Evangelical Presbyterian Church of England and Wales (EPCEW), Reformed Presbyterian Church of North America (RPCNA), Iglesia Presbiteriana de Brasil (Presbyterian Church of Brazil), Association of Reformed Baptist Churches of America (ARBCA), Reformed Baptist Network (RBN), Communion of Reformed Evangelical Churches (CREC), Bible Presbyterian Church (BPC), Presbyterian Reformed Church (PRC), and in a number of Independent congregations.

Library
The Smith-Singer Library contains over 12,000 printed volumes, mainly focused on the Reformed tradition.

References

Buildings and structures in Greenville, South Carolina
Education in Greenville, South Carolina
Educational institutions established in 1986
Presbyterian universities and colleges in the United States
Unaccredited Christian universities and colleges in the United States
Seminaries and theological colleges in South Carolina
1986 establishments in South Carolina